Ireland competed at the 1976 Summer Olympics in Montreal, Quebec, Canada. 44 competitors, 41 men and 3 women, took part in 34 events in 10 sports.

Archery

In Ireland's first appearance in archery competition at the Olympics, the nation was represented by one man, James Conroy.

Men's Individual Competition:
 James Conroy — 2255 points (→ 29th place)

Athletics

Men's 800 metres
 Niall O'Shaughnessy
 Heat — 1:49.29 (→ did not advance)

Men's 1.500 metres
 Eamon Coghlan
 Heat — 3:39.87
 Semifinal — 3:38.60
 Final — 3:39.51 (→ 4th place)

 Niall O'Shaughnessy
 Heat — 3:40.12 (→ did not advance)

Men's 5.000 metres
 Edward Leddy
 Heat — 13:40.54 (→ national record, did not advance)

Men's 10.000 metres
 Edward Leddy
 Heat — 28:55.29 (→ did not advance)

Men's Marathon
 James McNamara — 2:24:57 (→ 39th place)
 Danny McDaid — 2:27:07 (→ 42nd place)
 Neil Cusack — 2:35:47 (→ 55th place)

Women's 1.500 metres
 Mary Purcell
 Heat — 4:08.63 (→ national record, did not advance)

Boxing

Men's Light Flyweight (– 48 kg)
 Brendan Dunne
 First Round — Defeated Noboru Uchizama (JPN), RSC-2
 Second Round — Lost to Orlando Maldonado (PUR), KO-1

Canoeing

Cycling

Two cyclists represented Ireland in 1976.

Individual road race
 Alan McCormack — did not finish (→ no ranking)
 Oliver McQuaid — did not finish (→ no ranking)

Equestrian

Rowing

Men's single sculls
 Seán Drea 4th place in the Final (→ 4th)

Men's coxless fours
 Martin Feeley 2nd in repechage (→ unplaced)
 Iain Kennedy 2nd in repechage (→ unplaced)
 Andy McDonough 2nd in repechage (→ unplaced)
 Jaye Renehan 2nd in repechage (→ unplaced)

Men's coxed fours
 Jim Muldoon 1st in B Final (→ 7th)
 Christy O'Brien  1st in B Final (→ 7th)
 Willie Ryan  1st in B Final (→ 7th)
 Mick Ryan  1st in B Final (→ 7th)
 Liam Redmond  1st in B Final (→ 7th)

Sailing

Shooting

Swimming

References

Nations at the 1976 Summer Olympics
1976 Summer Olympics
1976 in Irish sport